Percival Springs Airport is a public-use airport located  southeast of Watson, Illinois, United States. It is privately owned.

Camping is a major attraction at the airport. The facility includes RV parking spaces and places for tent camping. In total, there are 24 camping spaces located at the airport for temporary and long-term camping. Adjacent showers and restrooms also support the facility.

Facilities and aircraft 
The airport has one runway. Runway 18/36 measures  and is made of turf. It has a  stopway at the north end. The airport has no FBO.

For the 12-month period ending March 31, 2020, the airport had 1100 per year, or 21 per week. This traffic was 91% air taxi and 9% general aviation. For that same time period, one aircraft, a helicopter, was based at the airport.

References 

Airports in Illinois